The Sommer 1910 Biplane was an early French aircraft designed by Roger Sommer. It was a pusher configuration biplane resembling the successful Farman III, and was built in large numbers for the time. One was owned by Charles Rolls.

Background
Roger Sommer had previously built an aircraft of his own design in 1908, achieving a few short straight-line flights in early 1909. This was housed at Châlons, where Sommer had a hangar between those occupied by Gabriel Voisin and Henri Farman. In May 1909 Sommer bought a Farman III aircraft, and on 7 August 1909 he gained fame in this by breaking the endurance record held by Wilbur Wright, making a flight lasting 2 hr 27 min 15 sec. Later that year he made a successful appearance at the Doncaster flight meeting, winning the prize for the greatest distance flown during the meeting.  Meanwhile, he had started building an aircraft of his own design at Mouzon in the Ardennes, where his family had a felt-making business.

Design and development
The design of the Sommer biplane was derived from that of the Farman III, the aircraft being a pusher configuration equal-span biplane powered by a  Gnome Omega. Lateral control was effected by D-shaped ailerons on the upper wing. A single elevator was mounted in front of the wings: behind the wings  wire-braced wooden booms carried a horizontal surface which was operated independently of the front elevator and was used to adjust the aircraft's trim rather than for control purposes.  Early examples has a single large rudder mounted below this: this was later changed to four smaller rudders, two above it and two below, and subsequently changed again to one above and one below . The twin skids of the undercarriage were extended forwards to form part of the supporting structure for the elevator, and a single pair of wheels were mounted on an axle between the skids. A  two-seat "Military" version with an extended upper wing  was produced later.

Operational history
A large number of examples were built: by spring 1910 Sommer had sixty aircraft on order. Sommer had established  flying school at Douzy using his machines.

One example was  bought by Charles Rolls, and was exhibited on the Royal Aero Societys stand at the 1910 Aero Show at Olympia

The Humber-Sommer biplane

A small number of license-built copies of the Sommer biplane were built in England by Humber. These were of mixed steel and wood construction, and one was used to  carry out the world's first official mail-carrying flight, when 6,500 letters were flown by Henri Pequet from the United Provinces Exhibition  at Allahabad to Naini. The letters bore an official frank "First Aerial Post, U.P. Exhibition, Allahabad, 1911", the text surrounding a drawing of the aircraft.

Specifications

Notes

References
Lewis, Peter. British Aircraft 1809-1914. London: Putnam, 1962
Opdycke, Leonard E. French Aeroplanes before the Great War. Atglen, PA: Schiffer, 1990
The Aero Manual 1910 (reprint) Newton Abbot, Devon: David & Charles, 1972  pp. 162–3

External links
 The Sommer Biplane Flight International 23 April 1910

Single-engined pusher aircraft
Aircraft first flown in 1910
Biplanes
1910s French experimental aircraft
Rotary-engined aircraft